USS Charlottesville (PF-25), a United States Navy  in commission from 1944 to 1945, has been the only US Navy ship thus far to be named for Charlottesville, Virginia. She later served in the Soviet Navy as EK-1 and in the Japan Maritime Self-Defense Force as JDS Matsu (PF-6), JDS Matsu (PF-286) and YAS-36.

Construction and commissioning
Originally classified as a patrol gunboat, PG-133, Charlottesville was reclassified as a patrol frigate, PF-25, on 15 April 1943. She was launched on 30 July 1943, by the Walter Butler Shipbuilding Company in Superior, Wisconsin, under a Maritime Commission contract, sponsored by Mrs. J. E. Gleason, wife of the mayor of Charlottesville, Virginia. The ship was commissioned on 10 April 1944.

Service history

U.S. Navy, World War II, 1944–1945
Departing New York City on 18 August 1944, Charlottesville arrived at Finschhafen, New Guinea, on 29 September 1944 by way of Bora Bora in the Society Islands.  She operated on convoy escort and anti-submarine patrol duty between New Guinea and the Philippine Islands until 6 March 1945, when she departed Leyte in the Philippines for Seattle, Washington.

Earmarked for transfer to the Soviet Navy in Project Hula, a secret program for the transfer of U.S. Navy ships to the Soviet Navy in anticipation of the Soviet Union joining the war against Japan, Charlottesville steamed to Kodiak in the Territory of Alaska after the completion of overhaul and modifications at Seattle. Training of Charlottesvilles new Soviet Navy crew soon began at Cold Bay.

Soviet Navy, 1945–1949

Charlottesville was decommissioned on 12 July 1945 at Cold Bay and transferred to the Soviet Union under Lend-Lease immediately along with nine of her sister ships, the first group of patrol frigates transferred to the Soviet Navy. Commissioned into the Soviet Navy immediately, Charlottesville was designated as a storozhevoi korabl ("escort ship") and renamed EK-1 in Soviet service. On 15 July 1945, EK-1 departed Cold Bay in company with nine of her sister ships – EK-2 (ex-Long Beach), EK-3 (ex-Belfast), EK-4 (ex-Machias), EK-5 (ex-San Pedro), EK-6 (ex-Glendale), EK-7 (ex-Sandusky), EK-8 (ex-Coronado), EK-9 (ex-Allentown), and EK-10 (ex-) – bound for Petropavlovsk-Kamchatsky in the Soviet Union. EK-1 served as a patrol vessel in the Soviet Far East.

In February 1946, the United States began negotiations for the return of ships loaned to the Soviet Union for use during World War II. On 8 May 1947, United States Secretary of the Navy James V. Forrestal informed the United States Department of State that the United States Department of the Navy wanted 480 of the 585 combatant ships it had transferred to the Soviet Union for World War II use returned, EK-1 among them. Negotiations for the return of the ships was protracted, but on 17 October 1949 the Soviet Union finally returned EK-1 to the U.S. Navy at Yokosuka, Japan.

Japan Maritime Self-Defense Force, 1953–1972

Reverting to her former name, Charlottesville was laid up in the Pacific Reserve Fleet at Yokosuka, and remained idle until the United States loaned her to Japan on 14 January 1953 for service in the Japan Maritime Self-Defense Force, which renamed her . Matsu was redesignated PF-286 on 1 September 1957. She was reclassified as an "auxiliary service vessel" and renamed YAS-36 on 31 March 1966. Decommissioned on 31 March 1969, she was returned to U.S. custody on 12 July 1972. Her fate thereafter is unknown.

Awards
The US Navy awarded Charlottesville two battle stars for service in World War II.

References

External links 
 
 hazegray.org: USS Charlottesville
 

Tacoma-class frigates
Ships built in Superior, Wisconsin
1943 ships
World War II frigates and destroyer escorts of the United States
Tacoma-class frigates of the Soviet Navy
World War II frigates of the Soviet Union
Cold War frigates of the Soviet Union
Tacoma-class frigates of the Japan Maritime Self-Defense Force
Ships transferred under Project Hula